The 1986 FIS Freestyle World Ski Championships were held between February 2nd and February 6th at the Tignes ski resort in France. The World Championships were the first to be held in the freestyle skiing discipline and featured both men's and women's events in the Moguls, Aerials, Acro Skiing and the Combined.

Results

Men's results

Moguls

Aerials

Acro Skiing

Combined

Women's results

Moguls

Aerials

Acro Skiing

Combined

References

External links
 FIS Freestyle Skiing Home
 Results from the FIS

1986
1986 in French sport
1986 in freestyle skiing
Freestyle skiing competitions in France